Awards and decorations of Uzbekistan are governed by the laws of the Republic of Uzbekistan on State Awards. The highest award is the title of the Hero of Uzbekistan. There are also orders, medals and honorary titles of Uzbekistan.

Titles

Orders

Medals

Honors

Honorary Titles 
Honorary titles are introduced for various categories of professions and occupations. The honorary titles are accompanied by the corresponding diploma and badges.

Certificate of Honor 
The Certificate of Honor of the Republic of Uzbekistan is awarded to citizens of Uzbekistan and foreign citizens, as well as enterprises, institutions, organizations, public associations, creative teams and military units and administrative-territorial units of Uzbekistan for labor and military merits, fruitful state, social and creative activities.

See also 
 Hero of Uzbekistan
 Orders, decorations, and medals of the Soviet Union
 Awards and decorations of the Russian Federation

References